Dadkhah is a surname. Notable people with the surname include:

Mohamed Dadkhah (1910–1980), Iranian philatelist
Mohammad Ali Dadkhah, Iranian lawyer
Negin Dadkhah (born 1990), Iranian speed skater

Surnames of Iranian origin